Zeita, Zayta or Zita (Arabic:  or ) may refer to:

Armenia
Zedea, an Armenian village, formerly known as Zeita or Zeyta, in the Vayots Dzor Province of Armenia

Lebanon
Zeita, Lebanon, a village in South Lebanon

Palestine
Raml Zayta, a Palestinian village in the Tulkarm District depopulated in 1948
Zayta, Hebron, a Palestinian village in the Hebron District depopulated in 1948
Zeita Jamma'in, a Palestinian village in the Nablus Governorate of the West Bank
Zeita, Tulkarm, a Palestinian village in the Tulkarm Governorate of the West Bank

Syria
Zita al-Gharbiyah, a Syrian village inhabited by Lebanese in the Homs Governorate
Kafr Zita, a Syrian town in the Hama Governorate

Turkey
Zeita (Anatolia), a town of ancient Anatolia

See also 
 Zeta, the sixth letter of the Greek alphabet